Río Segundo Department is a  department of Córdoba Province in Argentina.

Settlements
Calchín
Calchín Oeste
Capilla del Carmen
Carrilobo
Colazo
Colonia Videla
Costa Sacate
Impira
Laguna Larga
Las Junturas
Los Chañaritos
Luque
Manfredi
Matorrales
Oncativo
Pilar
Pozo del Molle
Rincón
Río Segundo
Santiago Temple
Villa del Rosario

Departments of Córdoba Province, Argentina